Enon is a small town in the Eastern Cape in South Africa.

Enon (formerly known as Witterivier) was formed in 1818 by the Moravian Missionary Society on request of the Area Landdrost Jacob Glen Cuyler, to serve as a buffer between the Xhosa, Tembu and Fingo tribes living outside the Cape Colony and the European farmers and towns inside the Cape Colony. The land was granted to the Missionary Society in trust, to be administrated on behalf of the Cape Colony in the interests of residents of the missionary station.

Within the first 35 years of its inception it was caught in the middle of three Cape Frontier Wars and the First Anglo-Boer War, and has been evacuated on three separate occasions.

Enon is referred to in the 1840s by James Backhouse in his diary.

In 1909 control of the town was ceded back to the Union of South Africa. The governance of Enon currently falls under the Sundays River Valley Local Municipality.

References

Bibliography 

 
 
 

Populated places in the Sunday's River Valley Local Municipality
Populated places established in 1818